Ko Mai Phai is a small island in Thailand, located between the Krabi coast and the Phi Phi Islands.

Name 
Though the island is also referred to by the English name Bamboo Island, the name was given by mistake, as no bamboo grows on the island. The name of the casuarina tree – groves of which cover most of the island – was wrongly translated as "bamboo".

Tourism 
Ko Mai Phai is a popular destination for snorkeling. Lionfish, leopard sharks and hawksbill sea turtles may be found in the surrounding waters.

References

Islands of Thailand
Geography of Krabi province
Islands of the Strait of Malacca